Jose Agerre Santesteban or José Aguerre Santesteban (29 December 1889 – 19 October 1962) was a Basque writer and politician who focused on Basque nationalism. He was known by the pseudonym Gurbindo. He was a member of Euskaltzaindia.

References

1889 births
1962 deaths
Basque writers
Politicians from the Basque Country (autonomous community)
Basque nationalists
Spanish male writers